Pratibha (Hindi : प्रतिभा) is a Hindu Sanskrit Indian feminine given name, which means "genius", "ingenuity", "light", "intelligence" and "splendour".

Notable people named Pratibha 
 Pratibha Patil (born 1934), 12th President of India
 Pratibha Parmar (born 1955), British director, producer and writer
 Pratibha Ray (born 1943), Indian academic and writer
 Pratibha Satpathy (born 1945), Indian poet
 Pratibha Singh (born 1956), Indian politician and member of the 14th Lok Sabha of India
 Pratibha Sinha (born 1969), Indian-Nepalese actress
 K. Pratibha Bharati (born 1956), Indian politician
 Pratibha Advani, Indian talk show host, anchor and producer

Notable people named Protiva 
 Protiva Bose (1915 – 2006), Indian writer

See also 
Pratibha Mahila Sahakari Bank, an Indian cooperative bank founded by Pratibha Patil
Pratibha cauvery, an oil tanker that ran aground when cyclone Nilam made landfall
Rajkiya Pratibha Vikas Vidyalaya, an Indian system of schools run by the Directorate of Education, Government of Delhi
Valmiki-Pratibha, an Indian opera created by Rabindranath Tagore

Hindu given names
Indian feminine given names
Sanskrit-language names
Indian given names
Nepalese given names
Given names
Telugu names